David Wilson (1805–1880), who was the incumbent at Fyvie,  was the inaugural Dean of the new Diocese of Aberdeen and Orkney, serving from  1865  to 1880.

References

 

1805 births
1880 deaths
Alumni of the University of Aberdeen
Deans of Aberdeen and Orkney